Richard Stanley Withington (8 April 1921 – 2 September 1981) was an English professional footballer who played in the Football League as an inside forward.

References

Sources

1921 births
1981 deaths
Footballers from South Shields
English footballers
Association football forwards
Blackpool F.C. players
Rochdale A.F.C. players
Chesterfield F.C. players
Buxton F.C. players
English Football League players